Mahneti is a small settlement east of Cerknica in the Inner Carniola region of Slovenia.

References

External links

Mahneti on Geopedia

Populated places in the Municipality of Cerknica